Sarah Hope Summers (June 7, 1902 – June 22, 1979) was an American character actress known for her work on CBS's The Andy Griffith Show and Mayberry RFD, portraying Clara Edwards.

Early life
Hope Summers was born in Mattoon, Illinois, the daughter of the town doctor, and future U.S. Representative, John W. Summers and Jennie (née Burks). She was reared in Illinois and later in Walla Walla, Washington, where her father was elected to the House. Summers attended Northwestern University in Evanston, Illinois, graduating in 1923 from its Northwestern School of Speech. She stayed in Evanston, teaching speech and diction, then moved to Peoria, Illinois in 1926 when she became the head of the Speech Department at Bradley University. While in Peoria, Summers started giving private acting lessons and became involved as a volunteer, and soon a director, in local theatre.

Acting career
A regional actress who often performed in one-woman shows starting in the 1930s, In radio she had parts in the anthology Destination Freedom, a series written by Richard Durham, dedicated to the retelling the lives of notable Negros in the Americas. Summers did not break into network television until her mid 50s, when she made her debut in 1951 on the soap opera Hawkins Falls, broadcast from Chicago. While she had a few uncredited background roles in short films, she did not make her first Hollywood feature film until 1957, with a small credited role in Zero Hour!. She continued in films as a character player.

Summers first attracted attention in 1958 in the semi-regular role as Hattie Denton on the western series The Rifleman, starring Chuck Connors. She guest starred on dozens of series including Maverick, Wagon Train, State Trooper, Rescue 8, Peter Gunn, Dennis the Menace, It's a Man's World, Mr. Smith Goes to Washington, Hazel, Gunsmoke, The Danny Thomas Show, M*A*S*H (TV series), My Three Sons, Petticoat Junction, Love on a Rooftop, The Pruitts of Southampton, The Second Hundred Years, Adam-12 and The Paul Lynde Show, and was a regular in the cast of the short-lived 1978 situation comedy Another Day. She made thirty-six appearances on the Andy Griffith Show, playing Aunt Bee's best friend, during the 1960s, and made five appearances on the post-Griffith spinoff, Mayberry R.F.D..

While her film work usually was in quite small parts, often unbilled, but she had a credited part as Mrs. Gilmore, one of the kindlier members of the witches' coven at the heart of Roman Polanski's 1968 film classic, Rosemary's Baby.

For nearly 20 years, from 1961 until her death, Summers was the voice of Mrs. Butterworth in the Mrs. Butterworth's syrup commercials.

Personal life
Summers met local businessman Claude James Witherell in 1926, the year she moved to Peoria to teach; the couple married in 1927 and had two children together.

Filmography

References

Further reading

External links
 
 
 

1902 births
1979 deaths
American film actresses
American television actresses
People from Mattoon, Illinois
People from Walla Walla, Washington
Actresses from Illinois
Actresses from Washington (state)
20th-century American actresses